Elizabeth Mitchell (born 1970) is an American actress.

Elizabeth Mitchell may also refer to:

 Elizabeth Mitchell (musician) (born 1968), American singer
 Libby Mitchell (born 1940), American politician
 J. Elizabeth Mitchell (born 1969), American politician, daughter of the last-named 
 Elizabeth Mitchell (1972–1998), American shag dancer
 Birth name of American actress Elizabeth Banks (born 1974)

See also
 Liz Mitchell (born 1952), Jamaican singer from disco group Boney M.
 Betsy Mitchell (born 1966), swimmer